The 1914 Detroit Tigers football team  was an American football team that represented the University of Detroit in the 1914 college football season. In its second season under head coach George M. Lawton, the team compiled a 2–3–2 record and was outscored by its opponents by a combined total of 106 to 27.

Schedule

References

Detroit
Detroit Titans football seasons
Detroit Tigers football
Detroit Tigers football